The effects of Hurricane Isabel in Pennsylvania were primarily related to tropical storm force winds across much of the state. Hurricane Isabel formed from a tropical wave on September 6, 2003, in the tropical Atlantic Ocean. It quickly weakened over land and became extratropical over western Pennsylvania the next day.

On September 19, Tropical Storm Isabel passed through southwestern Pennsylvania, though its large circulation produced tropical storm force winds throughout much of the state. The passage of Hurricane Isabel resulted in $160 million in damage (2003 USD, $187 million 2008 USD) and two indirect deaths in Pennsylvania. One person suffered from carbon monoxide poisoning, believed to be caused due to improperly ventilated generators in an area affected by the power outages. Moderate winds left about 1.4 million customers without power across the state as a result of trees falling into power lines, with dozens of houses and cars damaged by the trees.

Preparations 
While over the western Atlantic Ocean as a major hurricane, forecasters predicted Isabel would pass through the central portion of the state. Successive forecasts shifted the track slightly further to the west, though its track into Ohio was not anticipated. Hours before it entered the state, the National Hurricane Center continued to predict Isabel would traverse the entire length of the state from south to north and later entering New York before crossing Lake Ontario into Canada. Around 3% of those who evacuated in North Carolina and in the Eastern Shore of Virginia stayed in Pennsylvania during the storm. The threat of the hurricane canceled some flights in and out of the state. To compensate, Delta Air Lines allowed those flying to or from Philadelphia, Allentown, and Harrisburg to reschedule to a later date. American Airlines offered a similar option. United Airlines and United Express opted to waive charging fees for travelers in and out of the state.

Prior to the arrival of Isabel, Governor Ed Rendell declared a state of emergency for the state. The Pennsylvania Emergency Management Agency activated a support team to assist Urban Search and Rescue operations as part of the threat from the storm. The state's National Guard placed 2,990 guardsmen on Emergency Condition 5 status to be deployed anywhere in the state for emergency support, with other guardsmen readying equipment such as generators, heavy trucks, water trailers, and engineer equipment for deployment. State police officers were readied for deployment, while the state health department contacted hospitals to ensure generators were in working condition. The state Environmental Protection Agency prepared for the storm by monitoring the status of all dams, water treatment facilities, and nuclear plants. In addition, the Pennsylvania Turnpike Commission stationed extra workers to patrol the highways in poor drainage areas, with extra equipment prepared for quick response for potential road blockage. Prior to the arrival of the storm, officials from PECO Energy prepared its largest workforce in its history with 1,500 workers, including employees from Commonwealth Edison in Illinois and Detroit Edison.

Impact 
There, the surge flooded low-lying areas along the river. The large circulation of the hurricane produced moderate winds throughout the state, with wind gusts in the southeastern portion of the state reaching  in Forks Township. The moderate wind gust downed thousands of trees, tree limbs, and power lines. PECO energy reported their worst power outage on record with about 572,425 customers losing electricity. The Metropolitan Edison power company reported 300,000 customers without power, with 500,000 Pennsylvania Power and Light customers losing electricity.

Wind gusts reached  in northeastern Pennsylvania, resulting in scattered reports of downed trees and power lines. Tens of thousands were left without power. A few downed trees hit cars and houses, with damage totaling about $350,000 (2003 USD, $410,000 in 2008 USD). The fallen trees also closed some roads. The combination of the wind gusts and moist grounds from previous rainfalls resulted in hundreds of downed tree limbs, primarily in Dauphin and Lancaster Counties. Lancaster County reportedly suffered the worst wind damage since Hurricane Hazel in 1954.

The falling trees downed power lines and poles, causing power outages and some property damage due to the trees and poles hitting houses. One indirect fatality occurred when a motorist drove into a downed tree. Two other vehicles in Franklin County and a fire truck in York were hit and greatly damaged by trees. Downed wires set a Family Dollar on fire in Paradise Township and was believed to have started a fire in a church in Ringtown. Falling trees hit at least eleven houses, with one tree severely damaging a mobile home in Bellwood. Damage directly from the wind was generally minor, and included a house losing a chimney in Camp Hill, a carport being blown over in New Oxford, and at least four houses reporting roof or siding damage. The hurricane also damaged corn fields near Lancaster. Downed trees closed or disrupted traffic on at least 56 roads in the region, including U.S. Routes 6 and 322, as well as Interstate 83 in York County.

Pittsburgh reported  of precipitation from Isabel. Allegheny Energy reported 31,184 customers in the southwest portion of the state lost power, primarily in McConnellsburg, State College, and Waynesboro. Damage in southeastern Pennsylvania totaled $32.2 million (2003 USD; $37.7 million 2008 USD).

Aftermath 
Power workers immediately began repairing the power failures by clearing tree branches and replacing fuses and circuit breakers. Peco energy restored power to 72% of the affected customers by two days after the storm, with 85% restored by two nights. By two days after the storm, Pennsylvania Power and Light restored power to about 80% of its impacted customers, with about 93% restored by two nights after the storm. By five days after Isabel, most power outages in southeastern Pennsylvania were repaired, with all outages restored by a week after the hurricane. Allegheny Power restored power to about 20% of its customers by two days after the storm. Most power outages for the company were restored by five days after the hurricane, with all power completely restored by a week after Isabel.

On September 26, President Bush declared Chester County as a disaster area following the damage of previous Henri, Isabel, and severe flooding unrelated to either tropical cyclone. Officials opened a disaster recovery center in West Chester to provide additional information to disaster victims. By a month after the declaration, 342 homeowners and business owners applied for disaster aid, totaling to around $600,000 (2003 USD, $703,000 2008 USD).

See also 

 List of Pennsylvania hurricanes
 List of retired Atlantic hurricane names

References 

Pennsylvania
Isabel (2003)
2003 in Pennsylvania
Isabel